Elachista catalana is a moth of the family Elachistidae. It is found in Morocco, Spain, France, Italy, San Marino and Croatia.

Adults are large (for Elachista species), unicolorous white or creamy white with variably paler or darker grey hindwings.

The larvae feed on Dactylis glomerata. They mine the leaves of their host plant.

Taxonomy
Elachista modesta was previously treated as a synonym of Elachista catalana, but was recently reinstated as a valid species.

References

catalana
Moths described in 1978
Moths of Europe
Moths of Africa